Isaac de Castro Tartas (ca. 1623, Tartas, Gascony – December 15, 1647, Lisbon) was a Marrano and Jewish martyr.

Castro Tartas was born in France, where his parents had found refuge, under cover as Catholics, before moving to Amsterdam in 1640. Isaac remained with his family in Amsterdam only one year, where he continued studies in philosophy and Hebrew, before emigrating to Brazil with his aunt and her husband Moses Raphael de Aguilar. His parents and two younger brothers remained, one of them, David de Castro Tartas, later became notable as a printer in Amsterdam. The family was also related to the physician Elijah Montalto.

In 1641 he arrived in Paraíba, Brazil, where he lived for several years. Against the wishes of his relatives there, he went later to Bahia de Todos os Santos, the colony's capital, where he was recognized as a Jew, arrested by the Portuguese Inquisition, and sent to Lisbon.

Although a Dutch citizen, he was summoned before the tribunal of the Inquisition, where he at once avowed his belief in Judaism and his determination to remain true to the faith. All the endeavors of the inquisitors to convert him to Roman Catholism were in vain.

On December 15, 1647 (not September 23, as was erroneously supposed), this young man was led, together with five fellow-sufferers, to the stake. In the midst of the flames he called out in startling tones, "Shema' Yisrael! [Hear, O Israel!] The Lord our God is One!" With the word "Echad" (One), he died. For several years the public of Lisbon repeated his last words, so that the Inquisition was finally compelled to interdict this confession of the Jewish faith, under the threat of severe punishment.

In Amsterdam the tragic end of the promising young man occasioned deep mourning. A memorial sermon was delivered by Saul Levi Morteira (printed at the press of Isaac's younger brother), and elegies in Hebrew and in Spanish were written in his honor by Solomon de Oliveyra and Jonah Abravanel.

References and Bibliography

Cardoso, Isaac, Las Excelencias de los Hebreos, pp. 324 et seq.
Kayserling, Meyer, Geschichte der Juden in Portugal, pp. 308 et seq. (available here)
—, Sephardim, pp. 204 et seq.
Publications of the American Jewish Historical Society, iv 130 et seq.

External links
This Day in Jewish History, December 15

1647 deaths
Dutch Sephardi Jews
People executed by the Portuguese Inquisition
Conversos
17th-century Sephardi Jews
Year of birth uncertain
Executed French people
Executed Dutch people
People executed by Portugal by burning
People from Landes (department)
Executed people from Aquitaine
People executed for refusing to convert to Christianity
Portuguese Jews
Victims of antisemitic violence
17th-century executions by Portugal